On 8 July 2022, flood caused by a cloudburst in Amarnath killed at least 16 people and left at least 40 of others missing.

References

2022 floods in Asia
2022 disasters in India
July 2022 events in India
Floods in India
Anantnag district
Disasters in Jammu and Kashmir